Billboard Top Rock'n'Roll Hits: 1957 is a compilation album released by Rhino Records in 1988, featuring 10 hit recordings from 1957. The album was certified Gold by the RIAA on October 19, 1999.

Track listing
Track information and credits taken from the album's liner notes.

References 

1988 compilation albums
Billboard Top Rock'n'Roll Hits albums
Pop rock compilation albums